Tamuwan or Tamuwan Autonomous Republic is a proposed Tamu ethnic state within multicultural Nepal, which has had many ethnic groups striving for autonomy.  It is represented by the Mongol National Organisation as an umbrella group for all ethnic Mongoloids in Nepal.

See also
 Limbuwan
 Madhesh
 Tharuhat

References

External links
 Tamuwan flag

History of Nepal
Proposed states of Nepal